Timo Schisanowski (born 27 August 1981) is a German politician for the SPD and since 2021 member of the Bundestag, the federal diet.

Life and politics 

Schisanowski was born 1981 in the West German city of Hagen and studied law.

Schisanowski became member of the Bundestag in 2021.

References 

Living people
1981 births
People from Hagen
Social Democratic Party of Germany politicians
Members of the Bundestag 2021–2025
21st-century German politicians